Pack Up Your Troubles is a 1940 British comedy film directed by Oswald Mitchell and starring Reginald Purdell, Wylie Watson and Patricia Roc. It takes its name from the First World War marching song "Pack Up Your Troubles in Your Old Kit-Bag".

Plot
Garage owner Tommy (Reginald Purdell) and ventriloquist friend Eric (Wylie Watson) join the army and travel to France, where they are captured by the Nazis. However, Eric's voice-throwing skills come in handy in engineering their escape and in obtaining top secret information.

Cast
 Reginald Purdell as Tommy Perkins  
 Wylie Watson as Eric Sampson  
 Patricia Roc as Sally Brown  
 Wally Patch as Sgt. Barker 
 Muriel George as Mrs. Perkins  
 Ernest Butcher as Jack Perkins  
 Manning Whiley as Muller  
 G. H. Mulcaster as Col. Diehard

Critical reception
TV Guide called it a "Lightweight comedy worth watching for Purdell's and Watson's nice comic performances." and Sky Cinema similarly approved of the pair, "They're pretty funny together," though considered the plot "routine," but found compensation in "a very young and pretty Patricia Roc and some good old music-hall songs include Roll Out the Barrel, Pack Up Your Troubles and Goodbye Sally," concluding that the film was "Cheerful nonsense."

References

Bibliography
 Chibnall, Steve & McFarlane, Brian. The British 'B' Film. Palgrave MacMillan, 2009.

External links

1940 films
British comedy films
1940 comedy films
1940s English-language films
Films shot at Nettlefold Studios
Films set in England
Films directed by Oswald Mitchell
British black-and-white films
Films scored by Percival Mackey
1940s British films
English-language comedy films